Calamity Crush is a song by Foetus Art Terrorism, written by J. G. Thirlwell. It was released as a single in October 1984 by Self Immolation.

Formats and track listing 
All songs written by J. G. Thirlwell
UK 12" single (WOMB FAT 11.12)
"Calamity Crush"
"Catastrophe Crunch"

Personnel
Adapted from the Calamity Crush 
 J. G. Thirlwell (as Foetus Art Terrorism) – vocals, instruments, musical arrangement, record producer 
 Warne Livesey – production

Charts

Release history

References

External links 
 
 Calamity Crush at foetus.org

1984 songs
1984 singles
Foetus (band) songs
Songs written by JG Thirlwell
Song recordings produced by JG Thirlwell
Some Bizzare Records singles